Drummond House may refer to:

David Drummond House, listed on the National Register of Historic Places in Eau Claire County, Wisconsin
William E. Drummond House, listed on the National Register of Historic Places in Cook County, Illinois
Drummond Castle, 15th-century castle in Perthshire, Scotland
Fred and Adeline Drummond House, listed on the National Register of Historic Places in Osage County, Oklahoma

Buildings and structures disambiguation pages